Horace Jones may refer to:
Horace Jones (architect) (1819–1887), English architect
Horace Jones (American football) (born 1949), American football defensive end
Horace A. Jones (1906–2001), horse trainer 
Horace Jones (footballer), English football wing half
Horace Jones, a character in the film Angels in Disguise